Mpox is endemic in western and central Africa, with the majority of cases occurring in the Democratic Republic of the Congo (DRC), where the disease is reportable. There, the more virulent Congo basin virus type has been affecting some of the world's poorest and socially excluded communities.

Many cases occur sporadically or in small clusters, but large outbreaks also occur.

Early cases

The world's first case of human mpox was detected in a nine-month old child in 1970 in the Democratic Republic of the Congo (then Zaire), two years after it reported its last case of smallpox. The onset of their rash was on 24 August. That year, the disease was identified in another four children, including three in Liberia who were playmates. At the time, evidence of the virus was found in non-human primates in Liberia and Sierre Leone.

Active surveillance by the World Health Organization (WHO) between 1981 and 1986, identified 338 cases with a human-to-human transmission rate of 28%. Until 1986, 95% of cases worldwide were identified in the DRC. Cases were rare in people over the age of 15-years, and over two-thirds of infections could be traced to animal contact within the rainforests. Initially it was uncommon for a family member to contract the infection unless they did not have a smallpox scar.

1996 reemergence
A reemergence of the disease in the DRC in 1996 also saw a large number of reported but not all laboratory confirmed cases, with a high transmission rate and lower fatality rate; leading experts to believe a significant number may have actually been chicken pox. Some likely had both mpox and chickenpox at the same time. The DRC's Kasaï-Oriental region saw the largest number of cases during 1996-1997.

Between 1996 and 2005, mpox cases appeared increasingly in gradually older people, with less than a quarter of cases being traced to rainforest animal contact, and with greater close contact infections. Between January 2001 and December 2004, 2,734 cases of suspected human mpox were reported from the DRC. However, civil war limited surveillance and only 171 clinical specimens were obtained from 136 suspected cases; less than 5% of all reported cases.

2005 onwards
After 2005, the DRC was reporting more than 1000 suspected cases per year. Between November 2005 and November 2007, 760 laboratory-confirmed human mpox cases were detected; particularly in people living in forested areas, males, age less than 15-years, and no previous smallpox vaccination.

Many cases occur sporadically or in small clusters, but large outbreaks also occur. The risk of human-to-human transmission within households in the DRC was noted to range from 50% to 100% during the 2013 outbreak. The DRC's Bokungu Health Zone saw an increase in cases of 600-fold that year. In 2019 the DRC reported 3,794 suspected cases and 73 deaths. In the first nine-months of 2020, it reported over 4,500 suspected cases of mpox, including 171 deaths.

Mpox is reportable in the DRC, where the disease is endemic, and disease burden remains high. There, the more virulent Congo basin virus type has been affecting some of the world's poorest and socially excluded communities. A regional surveillance system collects reports of all suspected mpox cases, and where possible, they may be investigated.

References

Disease outbreaks in the Democratic Republic of the Congo
Mpox